Institute of Physical Education Chumphon Campus Stadium is a multi-purpose stadium in Chumphon, Thailand. It is currently used mostly for football matches and is the home stadium of Chumphon F.C. The stadium holds 3,000 people.

Multi-purpose stadiums in Thailand